Montezuma Was a Man of Faith is an EP by Andy Prieboy, released in 1991. The EP cover is an original stained glass piece created by Judith Schaechter. The inner photograph and image on the CD are by Ann Marie Aubin.

"Montezuma Was a Man of Faith" and "Joliet" previously appeared on the full-length album ...Upon My Wicked Son.  "Whole Lotta Love" is a hillbilly-fied recording of the Led Zeppelin song featuring an uncredited Johnette Napolitano from Concrete Blonde.

Track listing
"Montezuma Was a Man of Faith" 	(Prieboy) – 3:32
"Send in the Drugs" 	(Prieboy) – 3:37
"Joliet" 	(Prieboy) – 3:26
"Where I'm Calling You From" 	(Prieboy) – 3:25
"Whole Lotta Love" 	(Page/Plant/Jones/Bonham) – 3:03

References

1991 debut EPs
Andy Prieboy albums